The 79th Infantry Brigade Combat Team is an infantry brigade of the United States Army and the California Army National Guard. In late 2008, the 40th Infantry Brigade Combat Team was redesignated as the 79th Infantry Brigade Combat Team without changing its composition.

Unit history
Elements of the brigade can trace back their lineage to October 1881 when the San Diego City Guard was established, which later became the 251st Coast Artillery Regiment. The 79th Infantry Brigade was originally made up of the 157th and 158th Infantry Regiments (CO, AZ Army National Guard) and served as part of the 40th Division from Aug 1917-Apr 1919. From 1921-1942, it was exclusively made up of California Army National Guard personnel, the 159th and 184th Infantry Regiments. Its insignia reflected the three states that originally made up the 40th Division.

In February 1942, the 40th Infantry Division was reorganized from a 'square', two-brigade, four-regiment division to a three-regiment division without any intermediate brigade headquarters. Thus the 79th and 80th Infantry Brigades were deactivated.

On 2 February 2010 the United States Army Institute of Heraldry approved a new shoulder patch and distinctive unit insignia for the 79th IBCT.

2013 Afghanistan
In January 2013, the brigade headquarters was activated for deployment to the Uruzgan and Kandahar provinces in Afghanistan where they trained Afghan police and other forces. Twenty percent of the brigade have been previously deployed to Afghanistan before. In April 2013, approximately 75 Soldiers traveled to Camp Shelby, Mississippi to receive training for their Afghanistan mission. The group was reduced from the originally planned size of approximately 600 Soldiers. Of the 75 Soldiers, 18 deployed as a security force assistance team serving as advisers to the Afghan police, and the rest staffed an Australian-led task force, all within Uruzgan province.

Structure
The 40th IBCT was originally activated in 2007 as part of the reorganization of the California Army National Guard, which in turn was part of the restructuring of the total US Army. The 79th Infantry Brigade Combat Team was reformed from the previous 40th IBCT in September 2008.

The Army restructured and moved from the division to the brigade as the primary building block of combat power. The 79th Infantry Brigade Combat Team is organized under the Army's new modular brigade structure. The role of the brigade combat team is to act as the Army's basic tactical maneuver unit and the smallest combined-arms unit that can be committed independently. The brigade combat team is designed to conduct offensive, defensive, and stability operations. The core mission is to close with the enemy by means of fire and maneuver; to destroy or capture enemy forces; or to repel their attacks by fire, close combat, and counterattack. The brigade combat team can fight without augmentation, but it also can be tailored to meet the precise needs of its missions.

The 79th IBCT also has a state mission. In times of emergency, the governor may call the National Guard to assist civil authorities. The self-contained and modular structure of the 79th IBCT make it well suited to provide this support.

Order of battle
 1st Squadron, 18th Cavalry Regiment- (Azusa, California)
1st Battalion, 65th Infantry Regiment- (Cayey, Puerto Rico)
1st Battalion, 160th Infantry Regiment- (Inglewood, California)
1st Battalion, 184th Infantry Regiment- (Modesto, California)
1st Battalion, 143rd Field Artillery Regiment- (Walnut Creek, California)
578th Brigade Engineer Battalion- (Manhattan Beach, California)
40th Brigade Support Battalion- (Bell, California)

References

Further reading
US Army Field Manual 3–90.6 4AUG06, "The Brigade Combat Team"

External links
Brigade's old DUI
California Army National Guard, unit webpage
California National Guard website
Camp Kearny (San Diego County)

Infantry 999 079
999 079
Infantry 999 079
Military units and formations established in 1917